Model Engineer Magazine was first published (in the United Kingdom) to support the hobby of model engineering in 1898 by Percival Marshall, who was to remain its editor for over 50 years. It has been owned by Mortons Media Group since 2022.  The magazine addressed the emergence of a new hobby — the construction of models (often working) and experimental engineering, largely in metal. It transcended class barriers, appealing to professional engineers, jobbing machinists and anyone interested in making working mechanisms.

Contributors
The magazine has had many notable contributors, but foremost among these was LBSC (pen name of Lillian 'Curly' Lawrence). From the inter-war period to the 1960s he produced many designs for simple but reliable small model steam locomotives. Most of these were published in Model Engineer, and brought the construction of small passenger hauling locomotives within the reach of the typical home machinist. Other notable contributors include Henry Greenly, Edgar T. Westbury, J. N. Maskelyne and one of the most notable editors, Martin Evans. Fifty years later, the editor again has the name Martin Evans but is not of course the same person.

Model Engineer Exhibition
Model Engineer had a long-standing association with the Model Engineer Exhibition, originally held at Olympia in London. The exhibition was almost as venerable an institution as the magazine itself, and was notable for the display of some of the finest examples of the hobby.

Magazine content
The subject matter of the (now fortnightly, earlier weekly) magazine ranges from articles about techniques and tools to profiles of full-size prototypes of modelling subjects. The main content is, however, 'constructional articles' describing projects at various levels of detail. Such articles range from single pages to long-running series in successive or alternate issues, some of which can last for many months, if not years. These more detailed series generally appeal to a wider audience than those engaged in the project. It is often as much in the (often loosely) related anecdotes alongside as in the processes described.

Model Engineer today
Over the years the magazine has waxed and waned, but is currently enjoying the increased popularity of the hobby engendered by the availability of comparatively cheap machine tools from China and Taiwan. In 1990 it spun off a companion title Model Engineers' Workshop which enjoys similar success but focuses more on workshop techniques and tooling.

See also
 Bassett-Lowke
 Live steam
 Ridable miniature railway
 Model engineering

References

External links
 Magazine site
 Model Engineer Magazine online index
 Model Engineer Exhibition
 Model Engineer collection at the Internet Archive

1898 establishments in the United Kingdom
Biweekly magazines published in the United Kingdom
Hobby magazines published in the United Kingdom
Engineering magazines
Live steam
Magazines established in 1898
Mass media in Kent